Kömlőd is a village in Komárom-Esztergom county, Hungary.  It was the birthplace of politicians Dénes Pázmándy and his son, also named Dénes.

External links
 Street map (Hungarian)

Populated places in Komárom-Esztergom County